Bueng Kan is a sub-district (tambon) in Mueang Bueng Kan District, in Bueng Kan Province, northeastern Thailand. It is centred on the town of Bueng Kan. As of 2010, it had a population of 9,999 people, with jurisdiction over 11 villages.

References

Tambon of Bueng Kan province
Mueang Bueng Kan District